Halfway House is a village in Shropshire, England, halfway between Shrewsbury and Welshpool (in Wales) on the A458 road. Also, it is known to be halfway between Birmingham and Aberystwyth.

It has a pub called the 'Halfway House'. Its neighbouring village, Wattlesborough, has a shop and a cafe. It also has a village hall which is shared with Halfway House.
A mile to the north-east at Wattlesborough Hall the 12th century keep of Wattlesborough Castle survives, adjoining an 18th-century farmhouse.

See also
Listed buildings in Alberbury with Cardeston

References

Villages in Shropshire